Let There Be Rock is the third studio album by Australian rock band, AC/DC. It was originally released on 21 March 1977 in Australia on the Albert Productions label. A modified international edition was released on 25 July 1977 on Atlantic Records. It was the last AC/DC album to feature Mark Evans on bass.

Background
In late 1976 AC/DC were in a slump. "It was very close to being all over", manager Michael Browning said. "Things were progressing very well in London and Europe. We'd been through a whole thing with the Marquee where they broke all the house records. We'd done the "Lock Up Your Daughters" UK tour and the Reading Festival. It was all shaping up really well."
 "In the middle of the tour, I get a phone call saying Atlantic Records in America didn't like the Dirty Deeds album", said Browning. "That, in fact, they were going to drop the group from the label. And that's when things got really bad."

Angus Young said, "Our brother George asked us what kind of album we wanted to make and we said it would be great if we could just make a lot of guitar riffs, because we were all fired up after doing all this touring."

Artwork
The Australian cover features the fingers of guitarist Chris Turner, from Australian band Buffalo. "There was a bloke called Colin Stead, who was in Buffalo for about ten minutes," Turner recalled. "He was also the centrefold photographer for Playboy. He phoned me up and said he was doing the album cover for Let There Be Rock, but AC/DC were out of town, so could I help out? He wanted a flash guitar run up and down the neck. Apparently, when he saw it, Angus said, 'He's got fat fingers, hasn't he?'"

The cover of the international version, released in July 1977, marked the first appearance of the band's now iconic logo, designed by Gerard Huerta. The photograph used for the international cover was taken at a concert on 19 March 1977 at the Kursaal Ballroom, Southend, Essex, UK, by rock photographer Keith Morris.

Reception

Reception to Let There Be Rock was generally positive; according to AllMusic, which gave the album a rating of four and a half out of five stars in a retrospective review, AC/DC played "sweaty, dirty, nasty rock" and the band had "rarely done that kind of rock better than they did" on Let There Be Rock.
In 2001, Q magazine named Let There Be Rock as one of the 50 Heaviest Albums of All Time.

Cashbox said "Heavy metal is their special forte and there is plenty of voltage displayed on this electrified disc."

Eduardo Rivadavia of AllMusic enthuses, "Let There Be Rock sees AC/DC's religious-like respect for the simple art of making rock & roll brought to its logical conclusion: a veritable gospel to the glory of rock, canonized here in hymn-like worship. The near-epic title track to what is widely regarded as the best Bon Scott-era album, the song is a holy testimony, bringing good news to all those who believe in the healing power of rock & roll - amen! Oh yeah, it also kicks unholy ass!"

David Fricke of Rolling Stone wrote of the album in a 2008 cover story, "AC/DC's early albums were perfectly frenetic, but inconsistent. Their second U.S. LP was almost all killer. Scott sings 'Bad Boy Boogie' and 'Problem Child' like he's the enfant terrible...Angus' solos are true white heat." Amazon.com calls the LP "a break from the early 'novelty' approach to songwriting and a move to the more focused album-oriented view that the band would perfect." In 2006, AC/DC biographer Murray Engleheart wrote that Let There Be Rock "elevated AC/DC to the status of an album band, something that had previously been the exclusive domain of the likes of The Rolling Stones, The Who and Led Zeppelin." In 2000, Angus Young recalled to Guitar World that producer Mutt Lange once told him "of all the many albums we'd done with my brother George and his partner, Harry Vanda, the one Mutt wished he would have done, where he was envious of George, was Let There Be Rock." Band biographer Jesse Fink writes, "Wherever AC/DC ended up in the annals of rock history, this album would stand for all time as an expression of their unrivaled might as a guitar band."

Track listing

Australian version

International version

Notes
Track 5, "Problem Child", was originally released on Dirty Deeds Done Dirt Cheap in 1976. This is a shortened version of the original, missing the reprise coda.
For the original vinyl release, in all markets other than the US, Canada and Japan, "Crabsody in Blue" was featured instead of "Problem Child".

Personnel
AC/DC
Bon Scott – lead vocals
Angus Young – lead guitar
Malcolm Young – rhythm guitar, backing vocals
Mark Evans – bass guitar
Phil Rudd – drums, percussion

Production
 Harry Vanda – producer
 George Young – producer
 Mark Opitz – engineer
 Michael Fraser – mastering supervisor
 Al Quaglieri – mastering supervisor
 George Marino – mastering
 Eugene Nastasi – digital assembly
 Bob Defrin – art direction
 Richard Ford – artwork
 Gerard Huerta – cover lettering
 Murray Engleheart – liner notes

Charts

Certifications

References

External links
Lyrics on AC/DC's official website

AC/DC albums
1977 albums
Atlantic Records albums
Albums produced by Harry Vanda
Albums produced by George Young (rock musician)
Albert Productions albums